Andrew or Andy Wallace  may refer to:
Andy Wallace (producer) (born 1947), music producer
Andy Wallace (racing driver) (born 1961), race car driver

See also
Andrew Wallace-Hadrill